KEMC (91.7 FM) is an American NPR-member public radio radio station in Billings, Montana. Broadcasting from the campus of Montana State University-Billings, it is the flagship station of Yellowstone Public Radio.

References

External links
yellowstonepublicradio.org

EMC
EMC
NPR member stations
Radio stations established in 1973